Shaun Kelly Van Allen (born August 29, 1967) is a Canadian former professional ice hockey player who played in the National Hockey League (NHL) from 1991 to 2004. He played 794 games in the NHL and scored 269 points. He serves as the head coach of the Carleton University Ravens of the OUA.

Professional career
Van Allen was drafted 105th overall in the 1987 NHL Entry Draft by the Edmonton Oilers after a standout junior hockey career with the Saskatoon Blades of the Western Hockey League. He spent five seasons in the Oilers system with the Milwaukee Admirals, Nova Scotia Oilers, and Cape Breton Oilers but failed to catch on with the big club in Edmonton. While in Cape Breton, Van Allen enjoyed much personal and team success. It was there that he met his wife, and in 1991-92 he won the John B. Sollenberger Trophy as the American Hockey League's leading scorer. In the 1992-93 season, Cape Breton, led by Van Allen, captured the Calder Cup title as American Hockey League Champions.

Once the 1992-93 season had concluded, the Oilers released him. In July 1993 Van Allen signed as a free agent with the expansion Mighty Ducks of Anaheim and became an NHL regular until his retirement in 2005. He spent three seasons in Anaheim and became a versatile forward, able to contribute on the score sheet as well as kill penalties.

On October 1, 1996, Van Allen was acquired by  Ottawa Senators along with defenceman Jason York, and began perhaps his most successful period in the NHL. He spent four productive seasons in Ottawa before unrestricted free agency led him to the Dallas Stars, with whom he signed a two-year contract in July 2000. He spent parts of two seasons in Dallas before he was acquired by the Montreal Canadiens in the early 2001-02 season. After completing the 2001-02 season with Montreal, Van Allen returned to his former team, the Ottawa Senators, as a free agent. He was a regular in the Ottawa lineup in a defensive role until the beginning of the 2004-05 season, when the 2004–05 NHL lockout wiped the season out entirely. Van Allen announced his retirement as an NHL player in 2005.

Career statistics

Other
Van Allen was born in Calgary, Alberta and his family later relocated to Climax, Saskatchewan.

Van Allen served as the Director of Player Evaluation for the Ottawa Senators during the 2006-2007 season, with the responsibility of evaluating all players within the organization including professional players, minor league players, and prospects. He serves as the head coach with Ottawa's Carleton University Ravens of the OUA.

He can be heard on TSN 1200 radio broadcasts of Ottawa Senators games, to which he contributes commentary during pre and post-game shows. As of September 2008, Van Allen has appeared on Rogers TV broadcasts of Senators' games in Ottawa.

References

External links

1967 births
Living people
Cape Breton Oilers players
Dallas Stars players
Edmonton Oilers draft picks
Edmonton Oilers players
Mighty Ducks of Anaheim players
Montreal Canadiens players
Ottawa Senators executives
Ottawa Senators players
Saskatoon Blades players
Ice hockey people from Calgary
Canadian ice hockey centres
Ottawa Senators announcers